Abdel-Aziz bin Habtour (born 8 August 1955) is a Yemeni politician who served as Governor of Aden during the Houthi takeover in Yemen. He is a member of the General People's Congress, sitting on its permanent committee since 1995. An ally of President Abdrabbuh Mansur Hadi, he condemned the 2014–15 Yemeni coup d'état and received the deposed leader after his flight from the Houthi-controlled capital of Sanaa on 21 February 2015. He is also a vocal opponent of the separatist movement in the former South Yemen, saying the movement is too fractured and small to achieve its goals.

In October 2016, bin Habtour was appointed as Prime Minister in the Houthi-led parallel government.

Bin Habtour served as Deputy Minister of Education from 2001 to 2008 and subsequently as Rector of the University of Aden.

Personal life
Bin Habtour was born in 1955 in the Shabwah Governorate, part of what was then the British Aden Protectorate. He earned a bachelor's degree in economics and administration from the University of Aden in 1981, a master's degree in economics from the Berlin School of Economics and Law in 1988, and a doctorate from Leipzig University in 1992. He is married with five children.

Professional career
The University of Aden employed bin Habtour as a prorector from 1994 to 2001. In 2001, President Ali Abdullah Saleh named bin Habtour to serve as Deputy Minister of Education, an office he held until 2008. Afterward, he became president and rector of the University of Aden.

President Hadi appointed bin Habtour as Governor of Aden by decree on 22 December 2014. He was sworn in three days later. As Aden's new governor, he confronted the unrest created by the Houthi takeover in 2015, including a pro-separatist uprising in Aden seaport. He also met with Hadi after he fled to Aden from the capital of Sana'a.

At some point during the months-long battle for Aden in 2015, bin Habtour fled the city. In July, the Yemeni government-in-exile in Saudi Arabia announced the appointment of his former deputy, Nayef al-Bakri, as governor.

Premiership
On 2 October 2016, he was appointed as Prime Minister by the Houthis. On 4 October, he formed his cabinet. The cabinet, which includes members of the Southern Movement, is not internationally recognized.

On 28 November 2016, a new cabinet was formed.

On 13 December 2016, he accused United Kingdom of war crimes against Yemen, by giving bombs to the Saudi-led coalition.

On 5 April 2017, he tendered his resignation as Prime Minister by submitting it to the Supreme Political Council, according to sources close to him. This occurred after Houthi militiamen stormed the headquarters of the General Authority for Social Security and Pensions in Sana'a, reportedly taking over the establishment and seizing funds intended for pensioners.

References

1955 births
General People's Congress (Yemen) politicians
Governors of Aden
Leipzig University alumni
Living people
People from Aden
University of Aden alumni
Yemeni educators
Presidents of the University of Aden